In enzymology, a methylenetetrahydrofolate reductase (ferredoxin) is an enzyme that catalyzes the chemical reaction

5-methyltetrahydrofolate + 2 oxidized ferredoxin  5,10-methylenetetrahydrofolate + 2 reduced ferredoxin + 2 H+

Thus, the two substrates of this enzyme are 5-methyltetrahydrofolate and oxidized ferredoxin, whereas its 3 products are 5,10-methylenetetrahydrofolate, reduced ferredoxin, and H+.

This enzyme belongs to the family of oxidoreductases, specifically those acting on the CH-NH group of donors with an iron-sulfur protein as acceptor.  The systematic name of this enzyme class is 5-methyltetrahydrofolate:ferredoxin oxidoreductase. This enzyme is also called 5,10-methylenetetrahydrofolate reductase.  This enzyme participates in one carbon pool by folate.

References

 

EC 1.5.7
Enzymes of unknown structure